"The Duck" is a song written by Fred Sledge Smith and Earl Nelson and performed by Jackie Lee.   It was featured on his 1966 album The Duck.
The song was arranged by Fred Hill and produced by Fred Sledge Smith.

Chart performance
It reached No. 4 on the U.S. R&B chart and No. 14 on the U.S. pop chart in 1966.

Other versions
Bobby Freeman released a version of the song as a single in 1965, but it did not chart.
Sandy Nelson released a version of the song on his 1966 album "In" Beat.
The Olympics released a version of the song on their 1966 album Something Old, Something New.
Billy Preston released a version of the song on his 1966 album Wildest Organ in Town!

References

1965 songs
1965 singles
Songs written by Fred Sledge Smith